Colegio Americano de Torreón is a bilingual pre-nursery to 12th grade institution located in Torreón, Coahuila, Mexico. Core classes are taught in English. Graduates earn a U.S. high school diploma as well as a Mexican “Bachillerato” certificate.

History
In September 1950 the American School of Torreón began operating with 38 students and 4 teachers in a house provided by Peñoles, a local mining industry.

Four years later, the school had grown and changed its location to 20 Escobedo Avenue. By then, the number of students had increased to 250. Mr. Clinton A. Luckett and Mrs. Joe Athon founded The American School of Torreón with the support of a board of directors, a visionary and progressive group of locals and expats.

The first general director was Dr. Paul H. Jensen. The American School, also known as CAT (Colegio Americano de Torreón) was founded as a non-profit, non-denominational, co-educational institution. Since its beginning, the school has been accredited by S.E.P and since 1954 by the Southern Association of Colleges and School (SACS), a U.S. accrediting agency.

To this date the school maintains accreditation with both SEP and SACS. 

Ten years after its foundation, the school moved to a new campus located in Nogal 220 in the Torreón Jardin neighborhood. Thanks to a donation from the North American government, the first stage of construction was completed, consisting of auditorium classrooms and main offices.

Under the wise direction of Mr. Donald D. Jameson as Managing Director and Mr. Arnold C. Taylor as Vice Principal, the Colegio Americano de Torreón grew in size and prestige. 

After 70 years, with over 1,300 students, Pre-Nursery to 12th grade, close to 300 faculty and staff members, Colegio Americano de Torreón continues to be the leading school in the Laguna region.

Campus
Our current campus, donated by Mr. Efrain López Gurza, is located on an approximately 30-acre site in Los Viñedos, an upper-middle-class neighborhood in Torreon. Middle and High School divisions moved to these facilities in August 2001 and Elementary and Early Childhood in August 2006.

Facilities include 100 classrooms, three libraries, a Center for Visual and Performing Arts, which includes a theater with a capacity for 450 people, a cafeteria and eating areas, three gymnasiums, indoor semi-Olympic swimming pool, multiple soccer fields, covered tennis, basketball and volleyball courts, as well as a track and field arena. The latest project was the completion of an Early Childhood Center, which opened in August 2019.

References

External links
 Colegio Americano de Torreón

Education in Coahuila
International schools in Mexico
High schools in Mexico
Torreón
1950 establishments in Mexico
Educational institutions established in 1950